Thibaud Christa Philippe Verlinden (born 9 July 1999) is a Belgian professional footballer who plays as a winger for Beerschot.

Career

Stoke City
Verlinden was born in Brussels and began his career playing in the youth teams at Club Brugge and Standard Liège. In the summer of 2015, he joined English club Stoke City from Standard Liège for a fee of €40,000. He made his professional debut on 23 August 2017 in a 4–0 EFL Cup win over Rochdale. In January 2018, it Verlinden's joined 2. Bundesliga side FC St. Pauli on loan until the end of the 2017–18 season. Verlinden had already participated at two training camps of the club. He made just two appearances for St. Pauli's reserve side in the Regionalliga Nord during his loan spell.

Verlinden made his league debut for Stoke on 16 March 2019 in a 0–0 draw against Reading. On 2 September 2019 Verlinden joined League One side Bolton Wanderers on loan until January 2020. He made his debut on 14 September 2019, starting against Rotherham United and scored in the fourth minute to give Bolton the lead, however Rotherham went on to win 6–1. At the end of his loan period Stoke chose to recall Verlinden. On his return to Stoke, Verlinden made a number of Championship appearances from the bench until he sustained an anterior cruciate ligament injury in on 12 February 2020, ruling him out of the remainder of the 2019–20 season. After returning fitness in 2020–21, Verlinden was unable to force his way into Michael O'Neill's team and in December 2020, stated he wanted to leave in order to find regular first team football.

Fortuna Sittard
Verlinden joined Dutch Eredivisie club Fortuna Sittard in January 2021.

Dunajská Streda
Verlinden signed a contract with DAC Dunajská Streda on 3 September 2021. His tenure was to last one year.

Personal life
Verlinden's father, Dany, played professional football for Club Brugge and Lierse.

Career statistics

References

External links
 
 

1999 births
Footballers from Brussels
Living people
Belgian footballers
Belgium youth international footballers
Association football midfielders
Standard Liège players
Stoke City F.C. players
FC St. Pauli players
Bolton Wanderers F.C. players
Fortuna Sittard players
FC DAC 1904 Dunajská Streda players
K Beerschot VA players
Regionalliga players
English Football League players
Eredivisie players
Slovak Super Liga players
Challenger Pro League players
Belgian expatriate footballers
Expatriate footballers in England
Expatriate footballers in Germany
Expatriate footballers in the Netherlands
Expatriate footballers in Slovakia
Belgian expatriate sportspeople in England
Belgian expatriate sportspeople in Germany
Belgian expatriate sportspeople in the Netherlands
Belgian expatriate sportspeople in Slovakia